Guglielmo Pallotta (13 November 1727 – 21 September 1795) was an Italian Roman Catholic Cardinal.

Biography
Born in Macerata, Marche, he studied hydraulics and law in Rome and then was ordained priest. Later he became auditor of Cardinal Carlo Rezzonico and served in the Fabric of Saint Peter. In 1773 he was named Treasurer general of the Apostolic Camera.

Pallotta was created cardinal priest in the consistory of 23 June 1777 by Pope Pius VI with the title of Sant'Eusebio. On 1 July 1785 he was made prefect of the S.C. of the Council of Trent until his death. Pallotta was also Camerlengo of the Sacred College of Cardinals from 29 January 1787 to 1788.

He died in 1795 in Rome.

References

Sources

1727 births
1795 deaths
People from Macerata
18th-century Italian cardinals
Members of the Sacred Congregation of the Council
Apostolic Camera
Cardinals created by Pope Pius VI